Edward Winslow was an American Pilgrim leader on the Mayflower.

Edward Winslow may also refer to:

 Edward Winslow (scholar)
 Edward Winslow (silversmith), 1699-1753
 Edward Winslow (loyalist) (died 1815), loyalist leader during the American Revolution and New Brunswick politician and judge
 Edward B. Winslow (1846–1936) American industrialist and businessperson from Maine
 Edward Francis Winslow (1837–1914), railroad executive and officer in the Union Army during the American Civil War
 Eddie Winslow, a character on the television series Family Matters